Four ships of the Royal Navy have borne the name HMS Pilot, or HMS Pilote:

 was a 14-gun brig-sloop, formerly the French Mutin-class cutter Pilote. Pilote was launched November 1778 at Dunkirk; the Admiralty sold her in May 1799.
 was an 18-gun  launched in 1807 and sold in 1828. She became a whaler, making five whale fishing voyages between 1830 and 1842; she was last listed in 1844.
 was a 16-gun brig-sloop launched in 1838 and sold in 1862.
 was an 8-gun training brig launched in 1879 and sold in 1907.

Royal Navy ship names